Comet Swift–Tuttle (formally designated 109P/Swift–Tuttle) is a large periodic comet with a 1995 (osculating) orbital period of 133 years that is in a 1:11 orbital resonance with Jupiter. It fits the classical definition of a Halley-type comet, which has an orbital period between 20 and 200 years. The comet was independently discovered by Lewis Swift on July 16, 1862 and by Horace Parnell Tuttle on July 19, 1862.

Swift–Tuttle is the parent body of the Perseid meteor shower, perhaps the best known shower and among the most reliable in performance.

The comet made a return appearance in 1992, when it was rediscovered by Japanese astronomer Tsuruhiko Kiuchi and became visible with binoculars. In 2126, it will be a bright naked-eye comet reaching an apparent magnitude of about 0.7.

Historic observations
Chinese records indicate that, in 188, the comet reached apparent magnitude 0.1. Observation was also recorded in 69 BCE, and it was probably visible to the naked eye in 322 BCE.

In the discovery year of 1862, the comet was as bright as Polaris.

After the 1862 observations, it was thought that the comet would return between 1979 and 1983, but it didn't show up. However, it had been suggested in 1902 that this was the same comet as that observed by Ignatius Kegler on July 3, 1737, and on this basis Brian Marsden calculated correctly that it would return in 1992.

Orbit

The comet's perihelion is just under that of Earth, while its aphelion is just over that of Pluto. An unusual aspect of its orbit is that it was recently captured into a 1:11 orbital resonance with Jupiter; it completes one orbit for every 11 of Jupiter. It was the first comet in a retrograde orbit to be found in a resonance. In principle this would mean that its proper long-term average period would be 130.48 years, as it librates about the resonance. Over the short term, between epochs 1737 and 2126 the orbital period varies between 128 and 136 years. However, it only entered this resonance about 1000 years ago, and will probably exit the resonance in several thousand years.

Threat to Earth

Upon its September 1992 rediscovery, the comet's date of perihelion passage was off from the 1973 prediction by 17 days. It was then noticed that if its next perihelion passage (July 2126) was also off by another 15 days (July 26), the comet could impact the Earth on August 14, 2126 (IAUC 5636: 1992t).

Given the size of the nucleus of Swift–Tuttle, this was of some concern. This prompted amateur astronomer and writer Gary W. Kronk to search for previous apparitions of this comet. He found the comet was most likely observed by the Chinese at least twice, first in 69 BCE and later in 188 CE; these two sightings were quickly confirmed by Brian Marsden and added to the list of perihelion passages at the Minor Planet Center.

This information and subsequent observations have led to recalculation of its orbit, which indicates the comet's orbit is sufficiently stable that there is absolutely no threat over the next two thousand years. It is now known that the comet will pass  from Earth on August 5, 2126. and within  from Earth on August 24, 2261.

A close encounter with Earth is predicted for the comet's return to the inner Solar System in the year 3044, with the closest approach estimated to be . Another close encounter is predicted for the year 4479, around Sept. 15; the close approach is estimated to be less than 0.05 AU, with a probability of impact of 1 in a million. Subsequent to 4479, the orbital evolution of the comet is more difficult to predict; the probability of Earth impact per orbit is estimated as 2 (0.000002%).

Comet Swift–Tuttle is by far the largest near-Earth object (Apollo or Aten asteroid or short-period comet) to cross Earth's orbit and make repeated close approaches to Earth. With a relative velocity of 60 km/s, an Earth impact would have an estimated energy of ~27 times that of the Cretaceous–Paleogene impactor. The comet has been described as "the single most dangerous object known to humanity". In 1996, the long-term possibility of Comet Swift–Tuttle impacting Earth was compared to 433 Eros and about 3000 other kilometer-sized objects of concern.

See also 
 Lists of comets
 List of interstellar comets
 List of comets by type
 List of non-periodic comets
 List of periodic comets

Notes

References

Bibliography

External links 
 109P/Swift-Tuttle at the Minor Planet Center's Database
 109P/Swift–Tuttle at NASA's Jet Propulsion Laboratory's Small-Body Database
 

Periodic comets
Halley-type comets
109P
0109
Meteor shower progenitors
1860s in science
18620716